Darren Michael Hicks  (born 3 December 1984) is an Australian Paralympic cyclist who has won medals at several World Road and Track Championships. His right leg was amputated above the knee as a consequence of a road crash in 2014. At the 2020 Tokyo Paralympics, he won a gold and a silver medal.

Personal
Hicks was born 23 December 1984. In August 2014, he was driving a sewage waste truck downhill on Adelaide's South Eastern Freeway. He lost control of the truck due to faulty brakes and the resulting crash at Glen Osmond killed two people. A report prepared for the court in 2017 concluded the truck's brakes were faulty and that neither Hicks nor Cleanaway were aware and police charges were dropped in January 2019. The accident result in Hicks having his right leg amputated. Hicks had held his heavy vehicle licence for a month, and it was his fifth day working for that employer. It was the first day he had been alone on the job, and he was assigned an older, different model of truck than he had driven before. In December 2019, he told the court (in proceedings against his former employer) that he had not been asked if he knew how to drive a manual truck down that long descent. The truck's brakes failed, and it collided with three cars waiting at traffic lights at the end of the freeway. Two people were killed, another left with serious injuries, and Hicks' leg was amputated to extract him from the wreckage of the truck.

Cycling
Hicks is classified as a C2 cyclist. His first major international competition was the 2017 UCI Para-cycling Road World Championships, Pietermaritzburg, South Africa where he won silver medals in the Men's Time Trial C2 and the Men's Road Race C2.
At the 2018 UCI Para-cycling Track World Championships in Rio de Janeiro, Brazil, Hicks won the silver medal in the Men's Scratch Race C1-3. He won the bronze medal in the Men's Road Race C2 at the 2018 UCI Para-cycling Road World Championships, Maniago, Italy. He finished fourth in the Men's C2 Time Trial.

At the 2019 UCI Para-cycling Track World Championships in Apeldoorn, Netherlands, he won the gold medal in the Men's 3 km Pursuit C2.

At the 2020 UCI Para-cycling Track World Championships, Milton, Ontario, he finished fourth in the Men's 3 km Pursuit C2 and ninth in the Men's Scratch Race C2.

At the 2020 Summer Paralympics, Hicks won the gold medal in the Men's Road Time Trial C2 with a time of 34:39.78. He also won a silver medal in the Men's 3km Pursuit C2 with a time of 3:35.064, less than 4 seconds behind Alexandre Léauté of France who broke the world record. In the Men's Road Race C1-3, he finished twelfth.

Hicks won the bronze medal in the Men's Time Trial C3 and finished 5th in the Men's Road Race C3 2022 UCI Para-cycling Road World Championships in Baie-Comeau.

At the 2022 UCI Para-cycling Track World Championships in Saint-Quentin-en-Yvelines, France, he won the silver medal in Men's Scratch C2

Recognition
2018 - South Australian Sports Institute Athlete of the Year with a Disability.
2019 - Cycling Australia Para Male Road Cyclist of the Year.
2022 – Medal of the Order of Australia for service to sport as a gold medallist at the Tokyo Paralympic Games 2020 
2022 - AusCycling Men’s Track Para-cyclist of the Year

References

External links
 
 Cycling Australia Profile

Paralympic cyclists of Australia
Cyclists at the 2020 Summer Paralympics
Paralympic gold medalists for Australia
Paralympic silver medalists for Australia
1991 births
Living people
Australian male cyclists
Cyclists from South Australia
Amputee category Paralympic competitors
Medalists at the 2020 Summer Paralympics
Recipients of the Medal of the Order of Australia
20th-century Australian people
21st-century Australian people